Helle (Héllē), or Ellie, sometimes also called , was a character in Greek mythology who figured prominently in the story of Jason and the Argonauts.

Mythology
Phrixus, son of King Athamas of Boeotia and the half-nymph Nephele, along with his twin sister, Helle, were hated by their stepmother, Ino. Ino hatched a devious plot to get rid of the twins, roasting all the town's crop seeds so they would not grow. The local farmers, frightened of famine, asked a nearby oracle for assistance. Ino bribed the men sent to the oracle to lie and tell the others that the oracle required the sacrifice of Phrixus.

Before he was killed though, Phrixus and Helle were rescued by a flying golden ram sent by Nephele, their natural mother. For reasons unknown, Helle fell off the ram into the Hellespont (which was subsequently named after her) and either drowned or was rescued by Poseidon and turned into a sea-goddess, but Phrixus survived all the way to Colchis, where King Aeetes took him in and treated him kindly, giving Phrixus his daughter, Chalciope, in marriage. In gratitude, Phrixus gave the king the golden fleece of the ram, which Aeetes placed in a consecrated grove, under the care of a sleepless dragon.

With the Greek god Poseidon, Helle was the mother of the giant Almops and Paeon (called Edonus in some accounts).

Notes

Reference 

 Bell, Robert E., Women of Classical Mythology: A Biographical Dictionary. ABC-Clio. 1991. .

Princesses in Greek mythology
Family of Athamas

Boeotian characters in Greek mythology